The 1995 FIVB Volleyball World League was the sixth edition of the annual men's international volleyball tournament, played by 12 countries from 19 May to 9 July 1995. The Final Round was held in Rio de Janeiro (Main) and Belo Horizonte (Sub), Brazil.

Pools composition

Intercontinental round

Pool A

|}

|}

Pool B

|}

|}

Pool C

|}

|}

Final round

Pool play
Teams from the same pool of Intercontinental Round will not play.

|}

Venue:  Mineirinho Arena, Belo Horizonte, Brazil

|}

Venue:  Ginásio do Maracanãzinho, Rio de Janeiro, Brazil

|}

Finals
Venue:  Ginásio do Maracanãzinho, Rio de Janeiro, Brazil

3rd place match

|}

Final

|}

Final standing

Awards

Final round
Best Scorer:  Dmitriy Fomin
Best Spiker:  Gilson Bernardo
Best Blocker:  Pasquale Gravina
Best Server:  Gilson Bernardo

Intercontinental round
Best Scorer:  Rafael Pascual
Best Spiker:  Osvaldo Hernández
Best Blocker:  Oleg Shatunov
Best Server:  Lyubomir Ganev

External links
1995 World League results
Sports123

1995
FIVB World League
Volleyball
1995 in Brazilian sport